13th Anniversary Show may refer to:

EMLL 13th Anniversary Show
ROH 13th Anniversary Show